Murmur is the name of two characters appearing in American comic books published by Marvel Comics. The first incarnation of Murmur, Allan Rennie, first appeared in Generation X #12 (1996). The second incarnation, Arlette Truffaut, debuted in Alpha Flight vol. 2 #1 (1997).

Murmur (Allan Rennie) 

Murmur (Allan Rennie) belongs to the subspecies of humans called mutants, who are born with superhuman abilities. He is related to a Hellions team.

Fictional character biography 
Not much is known about Murmur, apart from that he was mutated into a pseudo-vampire form by Emplate. He joined a team that Emplate gathered to torment Generation X, including Bulwark, Vincente, and DOA. In an uncharacteristic move, Emplate not only recruited mutants for his team but a human as well: a woman named Gayle Edgerton, a Generation X member from the Chamber's past. 

When Chamber's powers first manifested, he unintentionally paralyzed Gayle. Emplate offered her [Gayle] a chance for vengeance, turning her into one of his vampire minions as well. They were successful in capturing the young mutants, while M telepathically called for help, a call which was answered by the X-Man Bishop. Vincente and Murmur collaborated to try to conquer him, but when Murmur realized he would soon be defeated, he fled along with Bulwark. With Penance's realignment of alliances, they were victorious in stopping the team.

Powers and abilities 
Murmur has been de-powered during M-Day. He had superhuman strenght and durability. He could open teleportation portals in space via his line of sight.

Bibliography 
Generation X #11-12, 14

Murmur (Arlette Truffaut) 

Murmur (Arlette Truffaut) belongs to the subspecies of humans called mutants, who are born with superhuman abilities. She is a former member of the superhero team Alpha Flight. She is currently in Beta Flight.

Fictional character biography 
Murmur became a member of Alpha Flight while the team was being heavily influenced by the Canadian government. One of her main duties is to mentally control the powerful beast known as Sasquatch, believed to be former Alpha Flight member Walter Langowski. During one of her first missions, against the criminal organization known as Zodiac, she lost control of Sasquatch. Murmur and some of her teammates were briefly mind controlled by Mesmero. Though she broke free, she couldn't take control of Sasquatch in time and he injured her. Manbot sedated Sasquatch. 

Murmur joins the team to kidnap Wolverine for the supposed murder of the ex-Alpha Flight member Box.  

The team meets up with Wolverine on a heavily forested road near an abandoned gas station. Murmur and Sasquatch, with Wolverine, investigate the hopping form of a man, who was the powerful mutant, Sauron.

Wolverine summons help and a fight break out between the two teams. It concludes on peaceful terms, due to the willingness of teammate Flex who wanted to talk instead of battle. Also, Alpha Flight is unsure of the motives behind the fight, as they have uncovered discrepancies. 

The mind-controlling leader of Alpha Flight, Jeremey Clarke, died in a battle with the criminal organization known as Zodiac. Murmur was shot in the leg by Zodiac members and was sidelined from action for some time.

Powers and abilities 
Murmur has been de-powered during M-Day. Her mind control ability allowed her to control the minds of others by touch. They are completely under her control and obey her verbal commands. Puck immediately fell asleep when Murmur touched him and used her power. She also has been shown to free people that were under Mesmero's control. She also demonstrated that she could directly kill a person using her power.

Bibliography 
Alpha Flight vol. 2 #1-20
Uncanny X-Men #355
Alpha Flight/Inhumans Annual 1998
Wolverine vol. 2 #142

Reception

Accolades 

 In 2020, Scary Mommy included Arlette Truffaut's Murmur persona in their "Looking For A Role Model? These 195+ Marvel Female Characters Are Truly Heroic" list.

Notes

External links 
 
Murmur at AlphaFlight.Net
Murmur at UncannyXmen.net

Articles about multiple fictional characters
Comics characters introduced in 1996
Comics characters introduced in 1997
Characters created by Scott Lobdell
Characters created by Todd DeZago
Marvel Comics characters who can teleport
Marvel Comics female superheroes
Marvel Comics female supervillains
Marvel Comics mutants
Fictional hypnotists and indoctrinators
Characters created by Steven T. Seagle